DRUMS (Debris Removal Unprecedented Micro-Satellite) is an experimental spacecraft that will test proximity operation near space debris. The microsatellite carries two 'mock space debris' which once deployed will be used as a target for demonstrating approach and contact.

Overview 
DRUMS was developed by Japanese company Kawasaki Heavy Industries (KHI), which will also operate the satellite following its launch. DRUMS will be operated from a ground station inside KHI's Gifu Works facility, and an antenna for communicating with the satellite was finished in October 2019. KHI characterizes DRUMS as a demonstration for future missions to remove launch vehicle upper stages from orbit, along with potential applications for on-orbit satellite servicing. DRUMS was launched on 9 November 2021 by an Epsilon launch vehicle. A half size model of DRUMS was displayed at the 2019 G20 Osaka summit.

Mission 
Once in orbit, DRUMS will deploy two nonfunctional objects, which will act as targets for DRUMS's space debris approach test. After distancing itself from the target, DRUMS will then begin to approach it using on board optical sensors. The microsatellite has nitrogen gas propulsion for maneuvering, along with lighting it will use to illuminate the target while inside Earth's shadow. Once it has arrived near the target, DRUMS will extend a  boom, which will be used to physically contact the target. DRUM's camera will record the overall sequence of the test.

See also 

 ClearSpace-1
 RemoveDEBRIS

References

External links 
 DRUMS

Space debris
Satellites of Japan
Spacecraft launched in 2021
2021 in Japan